FCM Bacău is an association football club based in Bacău, Romania. The club was founded in 1950 and was promoted for the first to the top league of Romanian football in the 1956 season.

FCM Bacău played their first top league fixture on 18 March 1956 against Dinamo București. Since that game they have played in 1319 first league matches and have faced 52 different sides. Their most regular opponents have been Dinamo București, whom they have played against on 84 occasions. The club has won 31 of the league matches against Argeș Pitești which represents the most Bacău have won against any team. They have drawn more matches with Brașov than with any other club, with 20 of their meetings finishing without a winner. Steaua București are the side that has defeated Bacău in more league games than any other club, having won 52 of their encounters.

Key
 The table includes results of matches played by FCM Bacău in Liga I.
   Clubs with this background and symbol in the "opponent" column are defunct
 The name used for each opponent is the name they had when FCM Bacău most recently played a league match against them. Results against each opponent include results against that club under any former name. For example, results against Universitatea Cluj include matches played against Știința Cluj.
 P = matches played; W = matches won; D = matches drawn; L = matches lost; F = goals for; A = goals against; Win% = percentage of total matches won
 The columns headed "first" and "last" contain the first and most recent seasons in which FCM Bacău played league matches against each opponent

All-time league record
Statistics correct as of matches played on season 2005-06.

References

General
 
 

FCM Bacău
Romanian football club league records by opponent